Marko Jeremić (born November 23, 1991) is a Serbian professional basketball player for Cedevita Olimpija of the ABA League, EuroCup and Slovenian League.

Playing career 
Jeremić played youth basketball for the BFC Beočin.

Jeremić played for Vojvodina from Novi Sad in the Second League of Serbia, and for the 2014–15 season, he moved to the city rival Vojvodina Srbijagas, which plays in the strongest league in Serbia. Jeremić also played for the Napredak Rubin from the Basketball League of Serbia. He played for the Mladost Mrkonjić Grad of the Championship of Bosnia and Herzegovina.

On September 13, 2017, Jeremić signed a two-year deal with Serbian club FMP.

On 21 June 2020, Jeremić signed for a Monterenegin team Mornar.

On 26 July 2022, Jeremić signed a 1+1 contract for a Slovenian team Cedevita Olimpija.

National team career
Jeremić made his debut for the Serbia men's national team during the EuroBasket 2022 qualification.

References

External links 
 Profile at eurobasket.com
 Profile at proballers.com

1991 births
Living people
ABA League players
Basketball League of Serbia players
KK BFC players
KK Vojvodina players
KK Vojvodina Srbijagas players
KK Napredak Kruševac players
KK FMP players
KK Mornar Bar players
KK Cedevita Olimpija players
Serbian expatriate basketball people in Bosnia and Herzegovina
Serbian expatriate basketball people in Montenegro
Serbian expatriate basketball people in Slovenia
Serbian men's basketball players
Basketball players from Novi Sad
Shooting guards